"Scrub Me Mama with a Boogie Beat" is a 1941 hit boogie-woogie popular song written by Don Raye. A bawdy, jazzy tune, the song describes a laundry woman from Harlem, New York, United States, whose technique is so unusual that people come from all around just to watch her scrub. The Andrews Sisters and Will Bradley & His Orchestra recorded the most successful pop versions of the song, but it is today best recognized as the centerpiece of an eponymous and controversial Walter Lantz Studio cartoon from 1941.

Animated short

Production 
The short version, released on March 28, 1941, by Universal Pictures, features no director credit (although Woody Woodpecker creator Walter Lantz claimed to have directed the cartoon himself), with a story by Ben Hardaway, animation by Alex Lovy and Frank Tipper, and voiceover work by Mel Blanc and Nellie Lutcher. The short uses blackface caricatures based upon stereotypes of African Americans in the rural Southern United States.

The "Scrub Me Mama" short is today in the public domain. Clips from it are featured in Spike Lee's 2000 satirical film about African-American stereotypes, Bamboozled.

Plot 
The short opens to an orchestral rendition of Stephen Foster's "Old Folks at Home", immediately setting the scene in the rural South of blackface minstrelsy. The setting is Lazy Town, perhaps the laziest place on earth. Neither the town's residents (all stereotypes of African-Americans) nor the animals can be bothered to leave their reclining positions to do anything at all. Their pastoral existence is interrupted by the arrival of a riverboat, carrying a svelte, sophisticated, light-skinned woman from Harlem (who bears a resemblance to Lena Horne), whose physical beauty inspires the entire populace of an all-black "Lazy Town" to spring into action.

The visiting urbanite admonishes one of the town's residents her mother, "Listen, Mammy. That ain't no way to wash clothes! What you all need is rhythm!" She then proceeds to sing "Scrub Me Mama with a Boogie Beat", which the townsfolk slowly join her in performing. Thus begins a montage which is the short's centerpiece. The townsfolk are infected by the song's rhythm and proceed to go about playing instruments, and dancing suggestively. By the time the young light-skinned lady from Harlem is due to get on her riverboat and return home, she has succeeded in turning Lazy Town into a lively community of swing musicians simply by singing. The cartoon concludes with the mammy washerwoman bending over, displaying the words "The End" across her buttocks.

Reviews 
Boxoffice (March 23, 1941): "To Lazytown, where all the colored folks are snoozing, comes a river boat and a gal. She wakes up everybody, and gets them in the mood with her rendition of the boogie woogie number. The action builds effectively. This one is for the under seat feet shufflers."

The Film Daily (March 25, 1941): "A light brown gal arrives in Lazytown and wakes the locals to the tune of a rhythm number. The music is hot and the former sleeping inhabitants step right out to it in this fast color cartoon. A couple of skirt silhouette shots and some exaggerated body movements make this one questionable for kid matinees."

Motion Picture Exhibitor (May 14, 1941): "This will not only provoke laughs but it is worth extra selling effort. All the colored characters take off on this popular song but with a high-brown beauty shaking hips to all points while beating a song with every note. It is in the better cartoon sphere."

Motion Picture Herald (April 28, 1941): "In this color cartoon a lazy group of southern darkies awaken on the arrival of a Harlem miss and proceed to get rhythm in the modern manner. It is a subject of especial interest to swing devotees."

Controversy 
The short was re-released in 1948. On October 20, 1948, the NAACP wrote a letter to Universal Studios. It objected to the "vicious caricature of Negro life in the South", and called the film "insulting, derogatory and offensive." They found the short to depict Black people as lazy and only activated by swing music. They also objected to the images of scantily clad, dancing young women. They requested the end of distribution for the film and better judgment from Universal.

On October 29, 1948, a representative of Universal wrote to the NAACP. He pointed out that none of the company's theaters had received complaints concerning the film. A few days later, on November 3, 1948, Madison Jones, Jr, who represented the NAACP, met with E.L. McEvoy, the Universal short sales distribution chief, at the New York City office of the studio. McEvoy defended the racist humor of the film. Jones responded that the NAACP was holding an education campaign against this type of humor.

McEvoy offered to let the NAACP contact the West Coast offices of the company, but he warned that in consequence for taking action, "niggers" would be prevented from getting work in the industry. He also claimed the NAACP members were better educated than the average audience member, who would not object to seeing racist images. Jones responded that this was a reason to avoid the racist films, that the audience might think them to be based on fact.

McEvoy pointed out that caricatures of Negroes, Jews, Germans, and Irish used to all be top entertainment. He emphasized that the office language at Universal also included the terms "sheenie" and "kike" (both used for Jews). He noted that the film had only been re-released since the Walter Lantz Studio had temporarily shut down (and stopped producing new content).

On November 20, 1948, the Los Angeles Tribune published an article on the complaints of the NAACP. On February 3, 1949, Universal announced in a press release that the studio was withdrawing the film, following the protest. A memo dated February 19, 1949, revealed that the Jewish Labor Committee had co-operated with the NAACP in protesting the film.

The controversy was a shock to Walter Lantz, who prided himself on avoiding problems with the censors. He repeatedly stated that his cartoons were never meant to offend anyone. After the 1949 decision, Lantz made a major effort to exclude any offensive caricatures of racial or ethnic groups in his cartoons. He also promised that Scrub Me Mama would never be distributed on television; however, according to eyewitness accounts, the short was broadcast on TV during the 1950s and continued to be seen as late as the 1980s.

Gallery

See also 
 Censored Eleven
 List of films in the public domain in the United States

References

Sources

External links 
 
 
 

1940 songs
1941 singles
1941 animated films
Films about cities
Films about race and ethnicity
Films directed by Walter Lantz
Films set in the United States
Songs about black people
Songs written by Don Raye
Walter Lantz Productions shorts
1940s American animated films
Articles containing video clips
1941 films
Universal Pictures animated short films
1941 musical films
Film controversies
African-American musical films
African-American-related controversies in film
Race-related controversies in music
Race-related controversies in animation
Ethnic humour
Racism in the United States
Stereotypes of African Americans